This article refers to the song by Social Distortion. For the documentary film, which also features Social Distortion, see Another State of Mind (film).

"Another State of Mind" is a song by the American punk rock band Social Distortion. It is the second track on their 1983 debut album Mommy's Little Monster, and was released as a 7" single that year on their then-record label 13th Floor Records. The single was released again in 1989 on Triple X Records to coincide with the reissue of Mommy's Little Monster. The song also appeared on their 1998 live album Live at the Roxy and 2004 live DVD Live in Orange County, as it had become one of the band's live staples. It also appeared as the opening track on their 2007 Greatest Hits compilation. Was the first single of the band who archivied success alongside in the underground scene.

Meaning and Composition 
The song was written about Social Distortion's first North American tour of 1982, in which they went along with the band Youth Brigade, and talked about such hardships in concert life as daily travel from city to city, confrontation with the public and the full uncertainty of the next day, as well as frontman Mike Ness' longing for his girlfriend at home.

Cover versions
Green Day recorded a cover "Another State of Mind" as a bonus track on their 2009 album, 21st Century Breakdown.

References 

1983 singles
Social Distortion songs
Songs written by Mike Ness
1983 songs
Epic Records singles